Gerhardus and its shortened form Hardus are masculine given names of Dutch-language origin. People with those names include:

 Bernardus Gerhardus Fourie (AKA Brand Fourie, 19162008), South African youth pastor
 Francois Gerhardus Joubert (18271903), Boer general
 Rudolph Gerhardus Snyman (born 1995), South African rugby union player
 Gerhardus Liebenberg (born 1972), South African cricketer
 Gerhardus Petrus Christiaan de Kock (192689), South African banker, sixth Governor of the ABSA Bank
 Gerhardus Pienaar (born 1981), South African javelin thrower
 Hardus Viljoen (Gerhardus C. Viljoen, born 1989), South African cricketer
 Johannes Gerhardus Strijdom (18931958), Prime Minister of South Africa 195458
 Johannes Maritz (Johannes Gerhardus Maritz, born 1990), Namibian hurdler

See also 
 Gerardus Mercator (151294), Flemish cartographer
 Gerard (disambiguation)
 Gerhard (disambiguation)

References 

Dutch masculine given names